St. Henry District High School (SHDHS) is a private, Roman Catholic, co-educational high school in Erlanger, Kentucky, United States. It is part of the Roman Catholic Diocese of Covington.

References

External links 
 

Roman Catholic Diocese of Covington
Schools in Boone County, Kentucky
Catholic secondary schools in Kentucky
Educational institutions established in 1933
1933 establishments in Kentucky